René Vydarený (born May 6, 1981 in Bratislava, Czechoslovakia) is a Slovak professional ice hockey defenceman currently with HC České Budějovice of the Czech Extraliga. Vydarený was drafted by the Vancouver Canucks of the National Hockey League in the 1999 NHL Entry Draft and then played one season with the Rimouski Océanic of the QMJHL. He spent several years in the minor leagues of North America, playing for the Kansas City Blades, the Columbia Inferno, the Manitoba Moose and the Hamilton Bulldogs before returning to Europe in 2004. Vydarený has also played for the Slovak national team in several international tournaments.

Career statistics

Regular season and playoffs

International

 All statistics taken from NHL.com

References

External links

Living people
1981 births
Columbia Inferno players
Hamilton Bulldogs (AHL) players
Motor České Budějovice players
HC Slovan Bratislava players
Kansas City Blades players
Manitoba Moose players
Ice hockey people from Bratislava
Rimouski Océanic players
Slovak ice hockey defencemen
Vancouver Canucks draft picks
Olympic ice hockey players of Slovakia
Ice hockey players at the 2014 Winter Olympics
Slovak expatriate ice hockey players in the United States
Slovak expatriate ice hockey players in the Czech Republic
Slovak expatriate ice hockey players in Canada